Wow! is 1965 album by American organist Bill Doggett.

Track listing 
All tracks composed by Bill Doggett; except where indicated
"Wow!" – 2:36
"Oo-Da" – 3:52
"Ol' Mose Blues" – 8:06
"Happy Soul Time" – 2:48
"The Kicker" – 2:42
"Mudcat" – 2:36
"Ram-Bunk-Shush" (Henry Glover, Lucky Millinder, Jimmy Mundy) – 3:12
"Slow Walk" (Sil Austin, Irv Siders) – 3:35
"Fatso" – 4:39

Personnel 
Bill Doggett - organ
Andy Ennis – baritone saxophone, tenor saxophone
Elvin Shepard - alto saxophone
Billy Butler, Lamar McDaniels – guitar
Al Lucas – double bass
Emmet J. Spencer – drums
Charles Hatcher - percussion

References

Bill Doggett albums
Albums produced by Sid Feller
Verve Records albums
1965 albums